The 2019-20 UConn Huskies men's ice hockey season was the 60th season of play for the program, the 22nd at the Division I level, and the 6th season in the Hockey East conference. The Huskies represented the University of Connecticut and were coached by Mike Cavanaugh, in his 7th season.

The Hockey East tournament as well as the NCAA Tournament were canceled due to the COVID-19 pandemic before any games were played.

Roster
<onlyinclude>
As of July 25, 2019.

Standings

Schedule and Results

|-
!colspan=12 style=";" | Regular Season

|-
!colspan=12 style=";" | 

|-
!colspan=12 style=";" | 

|-
!colspan=12 style=";" | 
|- align="center" bgcolor="#e0e0e0"
|colspan=12|Tournament Cancelled

Scoring Statistics

Goaltending statistics

Rankings

Players drafted into the NHL

2020 NHL Entry Draft

† incoming freshman

References

UConn Huskies men's ice hockey seasons
UConn Huskies
UConn Huskies
UConn Huskies men's ice hockey
UConn Huskies men's ice hockey